The Cal State Fullerton Titans women's basketball team is the basketball team that represents California State University, Fullerton in Fullerton, California.  The school's team currently competes in the Big West Conference.

History
The Titans have a 575–706 all-time record as of the end of the 2015–16 season.

In 1970, the Titans were invited to the national tournament sponsored by the CIAW (a predecessor to the AIAW.) The Titans defeated West Chester to win the national championship 50–46. This is the last national tournament to play using six player rules — the following year the format converted to five player rules.

Cal State Fullerton has qualified for the NCAA Tournament twice, in 1989 and 1991. They have a record of 1–2. They went to the NWIT in 1985, lost in the first round, then won the next two rounds to finish fifth.

On February 3, 2013, women's basketball assistant coach Monica Quan, 28, was found dead on a parking structure at a condominium complex.

Year by Year Records 
Sources:

Postseason results

NCAA Division I

AIAW Division I
The Titans made five appearances in the AIAW National Division I basketball tournament, with a combined record of 8–8.

References

External links